Dan Cordtz (May 1, 1927 – May 4, 2019) was an economics correspondent for ABC News from 1974 to 1989.  He also worked for The Wall Street Journal and Financial World.

He died from cancer in Albuquerque, New Mexico, on May 4, 2019, at the age of 92.

References

1927 births
2019 deaths
ABC News
People from Santa Fe, New Mexico
The Wall Street Journal
American male journalists
Deaths from cancer in New Mexico